Mohamed Madihi (born 15 February 1979) is a Moroccan professional footballer who plays .

Career
At the end of the 2004–05 Botola, Madihi left Wydad Casablanca to pursue a contract with Emirati side Al Dhafra FC. However, he failed to receive an international clearance and returned to Wydad shortly after the 2005–06 Botola started.

Madihi joined FAR from Moghreb Tétouan in January 2009.

After he retired from playing football, Madihi became a coach. Madihi was manager of Maghreb de Fès until October 2018. He was appointed manager of struggling Botola newcomers Raja Beni Mellal late in the 2019–20 season, but wasn't able to avoid relegation.

References

External links
Fifa Profile

1979 births
Living people
Moroccan footballers
Moroccan expatriate footballers
Morocco international footballers
AS FAR (football) players
Wydad AC players
Al-Qadsiah FC players
Moghreb Tétouan players
Botola players
Saudi Professional League players
Association football forwards
Expatriate footballers in Saudi Arabia
Moroccan expatriate sportspeople in Saudi Arabia